Cristobal's Gold (French: L'or du Cristobal) is a 1940 French drama film directed by Jean Stelli and Jacques Becker and starring Charles Vanel, Conchita Montenegro and Albert Préjean. Jean Renoir helped the original director, Jacques Becker, prepare the film and worked on the script, before Becker quit after three weeks and was replaced by Jean Stelli. The film is based on a novel by Albert t'Serstevens. It was shot at the Boulogne Studios in Paris and the Victorine Studios in Nice with location shooting taking place around Villefranche-sur-Mer. The film's sets were designed by the art director Eugène Lourié.

Cast
 Charles Vanel as Le Coronel, le chef de la police 
 Conchita Montenegro as La Rubia 
 Albert Préjean as Dupuy 
 Jim Gérald as Un pirate 
 Dita Parlo as Lisbeth 
 Guillaume de Sax as Le capitaine 
 Georges Péclet as Philippe 
 Roger Legris as Le râleur 
 Jacques Tarride as Le médecin
 Jean Heuzé as Le lieutenant Saunier 
 Léon Larive as Le cuistot 
 Frédéric Mariotti as Un marin 
 Tony Murcie as Kériadec 
 Louis Robert as Un marin 
 Paul Temps as L'ingénieur

References

Bibliography
 Durgnat, Raymond. Jean Renoir. University of California Press, 1974.

External links

1940 films
1940 drama films
French black-and-white films
French drama films
1940s French-language films
Films based on Belgian novels
Films directed by Jacques Becker
Films directed by Jean Stelli
Seafaring films
1940s French films
Films shot at Boulogne Studios 
Films shot at Victorine Studios